was a  after Kajō and before Ten'ei. This period spanned the years from August 1108 through July 1110.

Change of Era
 February 14, 1108 : The new era name was created to mark an event or series of events.  The previous era ended and the new one commenced in Kajō 3, on the 3rd day of the 8th month of 1108.

Events of the Tennin Era
 1108 (Tennin 1): Minamoto no Tameyoshi, grandson and heir of Minamoto no Yoshiie, became clan leader of the Seiwa Genji after the death of his grandfather.
 1108 (Tennin 1): Mount Asama erupts, causing widespread damage.
 1109 (Tennin 2, in the 1st month): The emperor visited Iwashimizu Shrine and the Kamo Shrines.

Notes

References
 Brown, Delmer M. and Ichirō Ishida, eds. (1979).  Gukanshō: The Future and the Past. Berkeley: University of California Press. ;  OCLC 251325323
 Nussbaum, Louis-Frédéric and Käthe Roth. (2005).  Japan encyclopedia. Cambridge: Harvard University Press. ;  OCLC 58053128
 Titsingh, Isaac. (1834). Nihon Ōdai Ichiran; ou,  Annales des empereurs du Japon.  Paris: Royal Asiatic Society, Oriental Translation Fund of Great Britain and Ireland. OCLC 5850691
 Varley, H. Paul. (1980). A Chronicle of Gods and Sovereigns: Jinnō Shōtōki of Kitabatake Chikafusa. New York: Columbia University Press.  ;  OCLC 6042764

External links
 National Diet Library, "The Japanese Calendar" -- historical overview plus illustrative images from library's collection

Japanese eras
12th century in Japan